The  is the top-level American football league of France. The league was founded in 1982.

History
American football was introduced to France in the early 20th century, but for decades it remained an infrequent activity, practised only by American touring teams and wartime servicemen.
The formation of NATO in 1949 allowed for U.S. military settlements in France, and in turn the establishment of senior and high school teams representing these bases. They mainly competed in cross-border leagues sanctioned by the U.S. Air Force and U.S. Army, although some seasons featured a conference consisting solely of France-based armed forces teams.

While some French citizens attended the games, actual participation by locals remained negligible and the sport quickly declined when French president Charles de Gaulle withdrew France from NATO's military command, evicting American troops from the country in 1967. Nonetheless, a few modern era French teams claim the lineage of those military organizations: the Châteauroux Sabres are named after an eponymous team from the now decommissioned Châteauroux-Déols Air Base.

It was not until 1980 that a physical education teacher, Laurent Plegelatte, created the first "born and bred" French team, the Spartacus de Paris. The same year, he founded and chaired the National Committee for the Development of American Football. The Ligue Élite de Football Américain was created in 1982 under the leadership of Laurent Plegelatte with four participants. The Spartacus de Paris were the first ever champions of the Ligue Élite de Football Américain, but are now a defunct team as of 1993. 1983 saw a change of leadership from Laurent Plegelatte to Michel Gofman.

League set-up 
The league is partitioned into two conferences, each with six teams. The top three teams of each conference enter the playoffs. Until 1994, the final was called . Since 1995, the championship game has been called .

Trophy
Although the championship game is called the Diamond Helmet, the winners' trophy does not have the shape of a helmet. It is a shield similar to those awarded to the French champions of other rugby football codes, such as the Bouclier de Brennus and the Trophée Max-Rousié.

Teams

Active teams

Championship Game

Media
In 2022, the league is set to receive its first regularly scheduled television coverage on Sport en France.

Notes

External links 

 Official French American Football Federation web site
 EliteFoot

 

American football in France
France
American football
1982 establishments in France
Sports leagues established in 1982
Professional sports leagues in France
American expatriate players of American football